Sri Muktsar Sahib Assembly constituency (Sl. No.: 86) is a Punjab Legislative Assembly constituency in Sri Muktsar Sahib district, Punjab state, India. Since 2022, Jagdeep Singh Kaka Brar of Aam Aadmi Party is the MLA.

List of MLAs 
Chronological list of members of Punjab Legislative Assembly from Sri Muktsar Sahib.

Election results

2022

2017

See also
 List of constituencies of the Punjab Legislative Assembly
 Sri Muktsar Sahib district
Punjab Legislative Assembly

References

External links
  

Assembly constituencies of Punjab, India
Sri Muktsar Sahib district